Club Hoquei Caldes, also known as Recam Làser Caldes for sponsorship reasons, is a Spanish sports club based in Caldes de Montbui, in the autonomous community of Catalonia. Founded in 1961, the club currently plays in the OK Liga.

History
In 2015, Caldes achieved promotion to OK Liga, the second in a row. In its first season, the club ended in the fifth position, and consequently qualified for the first time to the CERS Cup.

In debut season, Caldes reached the semifinals where it was eliminated by Italian team CGC Viareggio.

Season to season

References

External links
 Official website

Catalan rink hockey clubs
Sports clubs established in 1961
1961 establishments in Spain